Peter Milner (13 June 1919 – 2 June 2018) was a British-born Canadian neuroscientist.

Biography
Milner was born in Silkstone Common and grew up in Barnsley, South Yorkshire, England. His father was David William Milner, a research chemist and his mother was Edith Anne Marshall, an ex-schoolteacher.

He worked at the UK's Air Defence Research and Development Establishment before moving to Canada in 1944. He was an electrical engineer, but became interested in neuroscience while his wife Brenda Milner was studying the subject at McGill University; he became a graduate student under the same supervisor as she, and later taught at McGill himself. In collaboration with James Olds, he is credited with the discovery the pleasure centre and pain centre in the rat brain.

In his 1974 article "A Model for Visual Shape Recognition" Milner mentions a popular hypothesis suggesting that the features of individual objects are bound/segregated via synchronization of the activity of different neurons in the cortex. The theory, called binding-by-synchrony (BBS), is hypothesized to occur through the transient mutual synchronization of neurons located in different regions of the brain when the stimulus is presented.

Milner received the Gold Medal for Distinguished Lifetime Contributions to Canadian Psychology from the Canadian Psychological Association in 2005.

References

1919 births
2018 deaths
People from Barnsley
Canadian neuroscientists
British emigrants to Canada
People from Yorkshire